David McInnis may refer to:

 David Lee McInnis (born 1973), American actor
 David Fairly McInnis (born 1934), American politician in South Carolina